Emilio Iovio (born 9 March 1962) is an Italian ice hockey player. He competed in the men's tournaments at the 1992 Winter Olympics and the 1994 Winter Olympics.

References

1962 births
Living people
Olympic ice hockey players of Italy
Ice hockey people from Ontario
Ice hockey players at the 1992 Winter Olympics
Ice hockey players at the 1994 Winter Olympics
Sportspeople from Hamilton, Ontario
Toronto Marlboros players
Niagara Falls Flyers players
Sudbury Wolves players
Bolzano HC players